Abbasabad-e Kheyrabad (also Romanized as ʿAbbāsābād-e Kheyrābād) is a village in Salehabad Rural District, Salehabad County, Razavi Khorasan Province, Iran. At the 2006 census, its population was 105, in 20 families.

See also 

 List of cities, towns and villages in Razavi Khorasan Province

References 

Populated places in Torbat-e Jam County